The 1958 Davidson Wildcats football team represented Davidson College as a member of the Southern Conference (SoCon) during the 1958 NCAA University Division football season. Led by seventh-year head coach Bill Dole, the Wildcats compiled an overall record of 5–4 with a mark of 2–3 in conference play, tying for sixth in the SoCon.

Schedule

References

Davidson
Davidson Wildcats football seasons
Davidson Wildcats football